Robert "Bob" Spurr (birth registered fourth ¼ 1949) is an English former professional rugby league footballer who played in the 1960s, 1970s and 1980s.

Background
Bob Spurr's birth was registered in Pontefract district, West Riding of Yorkshire, England.

Playing career

County honours
Robert Spurr won caps playing  for Yorkshire while at Castleford in the 7–10 defeat by Cumberland at Workington Town's stadium on Wednesday 11 September 1974, and in the 16–17 defeat by Cumberland at Hull Kingston Rovers' stadium on Tuesday 17 September 1974.

County Cup Final appearances
Robert Spurr played  in Castleford's 17–7 victory over Featherstone Rovers in the 1977 Yorkshire County Cup Final during the 1977–78 season at Headingley Rugby Stadium, Leeds on Saturday 15 October 1977, and played  in the 10–5 victory over Bradford Northern in the 1981 Yorkshire County Cup Final during the 1981–82 season at Headingley Rugby Stadium, Leeds on Saturday 3 October 1981.

BBC2 Floodlit Trophy Final appearances
Robert Spurr played  in Castleford's 12–4 victory over Leigh in the 1976 BBC2 Floodlit Trophy Final during the 1976–77 season at Hilton Park, Leigh on Tuesday 14 December 1976.

Player's No.6 Trophy Final appearances
Robert Spurr played  in Castleford's 25–15 victory over Blackpool Borough in the 1976–77 Player's No.6 Trophy Final during the 1976–77 season at The Willows, Salford on Saturday 22 January 1977.

Club career
Robert Spurr made his début for Featherstone Rovers against Castleford on Sunday 21 August 1983, and he played his last match for Featherstone Rovers against Fulham at Craven Cottage in October 1987.

Testimonial match
Robert Spurr's Testimonial match at Castleford took place in 1981.

Genealogical information
Robert Spurr is the father of the rugby league footballers Chris Spurr and Mark Spurr (York City Knights).

References

External links
Statistics at rugbyleagueproject.org

1949 births
Living people
Bradford Bulls players
Castleford Tigers players
English rugby league players
Featherstone Rovers players
Rugby league hookers
Rugby league players from Pontefract
Yorkshire rugby league team players